Mutants in Mega City One may refer to:
"Mutants in Mega-City One", 1985 single by English band The Fink Brothers
"Mutants in Mega-City One", 2007 Judge Dredd story, published in the comic 2000 AD